Francis Grist Mill is a historic grist mill located at Waynesville, Haywood County, North Carolina.  It was built in 1887, and is a 1 1/2-story, heavy timber frame mill building sheathed in board-and-batten siding.  It has an overshot water wheel and (restored) wheel mechanisms, gears and pulleys underneath the main floor.  From 2004 to 2008, the mill underwent a successful restoration in order to get the mill functioning again.

It was listed on the National Register of Historic Places in 2013.

References

Grinding mills in North Carolina
Grinding mills on the National Register of Historic Places in North Carolina
Industrial buildings completed in 1887
Buildings and structures in Haywood County, North Carolina
National Register of Historic Places in Haywood County, North Carolina
Waynesville, North Carolina